Carlos "Mosquito" Domingos Massoni, commonly known as Mosquito Massoni (born January 4, 1939), is a Brazilian former professional basketball player.

National team career
Massoni played with the senior Brazilian national team at the 1963 FIBA World Cup, where he won a gold medal. He also won a silver medal at the 1970 FIBA World Cup. In addition, he also won bronze medals at the 1960 Summer Olympic Games, the 1964 Summer Olympic Games, and the 1967 FIBA World Cup.

References
  
 

1939 births
Living people
Basketball players at the 1960 Summer Olympics
Basketball players at the 1964 Summer Olympics
Basketball players at the 1968 Summer Olympics
Basketball players at the 1972 Summer Olympics
Esporte Clube Sírio basketball players
FIBA World Championship-winning players
Medalists at the 1960 Summer Olympics
Medalists at the 1964 Summer Olympics
Olympic basketball players of Brazil
Olympic bronze medalists for Brazil
Olympic medalists in basketball
Pan American Games bronze medalists for Brazil
Pan American Games gold medalists for Brazil
Pan American Games medalists in basketball
Pan American Games silver medalists for Brazil
Shooting guards
Sociedade Esportiva Palmeiras basketball players
Basketball players from São Paulo
Basketball players at the 1959 Pan American Games
Basketball players at the 1963 Pan American Games
Basketball players at the 1971 Pan American Games
Medalists at the 1971 Pan American Games
Brazilian men's basketball players
1963 FIBA World Championship players
1967 FIBA World Championship players
1970 FIBA World Championship players